Autumn Isabella Chiklis (born October 9, 1993) is an American actress and writer. She is best known for her role as Cassidy Mackey on The Shield (2002–2008).

Life and career
Chiklis is the daughter of actors Michael Chiklis and Michelle Moran, and she has a younger sister Odessa, born in 1999. She was born on October 9, 1993, in Vancouver, British Columbia, Canada while her father was shooting the television series The Commish.  According to him, she was named Autumn "because she was born on such a beautiful autumn day." She was very close to her father growing up, calling him her best friend. Chiklis described herself as bookish and quiet, contrasting with her fun, partying mother. Between 2002 and 2008, she portrayed Cassidy Mackey on the TV show The Shield, the daughter of her real-life father, who played corrupt police officer Vic Mackey. Chiklis was not allowed to watch the entire show due to the mature subject matter.

She attended Harvard-Westlake School in Los Angeles, graduating in 2012. Chiklis then attended the University of Southern California and joined a sorority. She graduated in 2016 with a degree in theater and screenwriting. In August 2018, her first book, Smothered was published and became an LA Times Bestseller. Detailing the adventures of Elouise Hansen and her mother Shelly, the book is a fictionalized take on Chiklis's own upbringing. Town & Country called the book "a humorous tale of the struggles that come after graduating summa cum laude."

In addition to acting and writing, Chiklis has also done stand-up comedy.

Filmography

Bibliography

References

External links
 
 SDA alumni offer ways to stay creative at home

1993 births
21st-century American actresses
21st-century American writers
American child actresses
American people of Greek descent
American people of Irish descent
American television actresses
Harvard-Westlake School alumni
Living people
University of Southern California alumni